Andrew May   is an Australian social historian. He is a professor of Australian history in the School of Historical and Philosophical Studies of the University of Melbourne.

Education and career
May has a D.Phil from the University of Melbourne.

He is producer of My Marvellous Melbourne, a podcast. He has curated a number of exhibitions at the City Gallery, Melbourne, including Read all about it! Melbourne's newsboys (2005); Flush! A quest for Melbourne's best public toilets in Art, Architecture & History (2006, with Kirsty Fletcher and Nicki Adams); Paper City: Logos Letterheads and Creative Designs (2011); and City Songs (2017, with Zoe Ali and Christos Tsiolkas). 

He is lead investigator on a project titled Cancer Culture, funded by the Australian Research Council in partnership with Cancer Council Victoria.

He has been a historian member of the Heritage Council of Victoria since 2015, and deputy chair since 2020.

Honours and recognition
He was elected a fellow of the Royal Asiatic Society of Great Britain and Ireland in 2013, and of the Academy of the Social Sciences in Australia in 2018.

Books 
As author:
 Melbourne Street Life (1998), Melbourne Scholarly Publishing 
 Espresso! Melbourne Coffee Stories (2001), Arcadia 
 Federation Square (with Norman Day) (2003), Hardie Grant Books 
 Welsh Missionaries and British Imperialism: The Empire of Clouds in North-East India (2012), Manchester University Press 

As editor:
 The Living Heart: Images and Prospects for Central Melbourne (1993), Monash Publications in History 
 Evangelists of Empire?: Missionaries in Colonial History (with A. Barry, J. Cruikshank, P. Grimshaw) (2008), eScholarship Research Centre and The School of Historical Studies 
 The Encyclopedia of Melbourne (with S. Swain), 2005, Cambridge University Press 
 Missionaries, Indigenous Peoples and Cultural Exchange (with P. Grimshaw), (2010), Sussex Academic Press 

Historians of Australia
Fellows of the Academy of the Social Sciences in Australia
University of Melbourne alumni

References 

1963 births
Living people
Academic staff of the University of Melbourne